California School for the Deaf may refer to:

California School for the Deaf, Fremont
California School for the Deaf, Riverside